Cohuna  is a town situated  north of Melbourne, on the Murray Valley Highway, in northern Victoria, Australia.

History
A post office opened in the area on 18 September 1875, known as Mologa until 1876, then Cohuna, and renamed Cullen in 1884 when Cohuna Township PO opened. This latter office was renamed Cohuna around 1887.

The Cohuna Magistrates' Court closed on 1 January 1990.

The Cohuna & District Historical Society has a museum that is open to visitors. The museum is in the old Scots Church building. The collection contains a variety of old household items and memorabilia from the district.

The town today

Surrounded by dairy farms and situated on the banks of Gunbower Creek, (an anabranch of the Murray River), the town is a popular holiday spot as well as a regional sports centre with a wide range of facilities.

Cohuna is the main access point to the attractions of the vast red gum and box forest covered Gunbower Island, which lies between Gunbower Creek and the Murray, and is home to diverse native birdlife, kangaroos and emus.

Legend has it that John Farnham was 'discovered' in Cohuna, and he returned in 2002 for a free one-off show.  The Bee Gees also played in Cohuna in their early days.

More recently, Australian artist Sarah Blasko used Cohuna landmarks such as a local cafe and hospital for her video "Planet New Year".

Gunbower Creek runs along the Main Street and Garden Park. Golf, tennis, parkrun, camping, fishing, water-skiing, canoeing, birdwatching and bushwalking are popular with visitors.

The Cohuna water tower is adorned with the town's name, and visible for kilometres.

Cohuna is a plastic bag free town.

Residents partake in an annual sheep hurling contest every October. Famous local, Percival Pankhurst, holds the record after throwing one sheep a staggering 437 metres in 1891.

Events and sport
The Cohuna Bridge to Bridge is an annual charity event that includes seven run and cycle events for all ages and abilities and raises funds for the Cohuna District Hospital. The program of events includes a 21.1km half marathon trail run, 12.5km trail run, 6.5km fun run/walk, Kids K 1km junior run/walk, 25km and 50km cycle events and 6.5km junior cycle event. The event is held on the first Sunday in March each year.

Cohuna hosts an Easter tennis tournament and golf tournament.

The local agricultural show is held in March and is organised by the Cohuna Agricultural, Pastoral & Horticultural Society. The first Cohuna Show was held in 1911.

The town has an Australian rules football team competing in the Central Murray Football League, the Cohuna Kangas.

Golfers play at the Cohuna Golf Club on Weymouth Road.

parkrun is part of a global network of parkruns. Cohuna parkrun is a weekly FREE 5km timed run or walk around our beautiful waterways held every Saturday at 8.00am. Please arrive by 7.45am for briefing. Join in for some fun and exercise. Children welcome, those under 11 must be accompanied by an adult. One dog, one pram per person allowed. It's free, but please register before you first come along. Only ever register with parkrun once. Don't forget to bring a printed copy of your barcode. Meet on the creek side behind Gateway Information Centre in Garden Park. https://www.parkrun.com.au/cohuna/

See also
 Cohuna railway line

References

External links

Community website

Towns in Victoria (Australia)